Performance Index Rating (PIR) is a basketball mathematical statistical formula that is used by the Euroleague Basketball Company's first and second tier competitions, the EuroLeague and the EuroCup, as well as various European national domestic and regional leagues. It is a part of the Tendex basketball rating system. It is also variously referred to as Performance Index Ranking, Rating, Ranking, Evaluation, Valuation, and Efficiency. It is similar to, but not exactly the same as, the NBA's Efficiency (EFF) stat.

History
Performance Index Rating was created in 1991, by the Spanish ACB League, which started using it to determine the league's MVP of the Week and regular season MVP awards. In 2004, the ACB League changed the criteria by which it chooses the regular season MVP award, but it continues to use PIR to determine the MVP of each week of the season.

The PIR stat was at one time used to determine the MVPs of separate stages of the EuroLeague season. Like the MVP of the Round, the regular season MVP, and the top 16 MVP. However, this changed when the EuroLeague MVP award became based on a voting process, starting with the 2004–05 season. Performance Index Rating is still used to determine the EuroLeague MVP of the Round and the second-tier EuroCup MVP of the Round awards.

The validity of major European basketball leagues using PIR as a way to rank players and give MVP awards has been criticized, over the fact that it does not take into account, nor use, any weighting system to determine the importance of each individual stat; unlike the Player Efficiency Rating (PER) rating stat, which was created by sports writer John Hollinger, when he worked at ESPN.

Calculation
The stat's formula is:

See also 
Tendex
PER
Efficiency
Offensive Rating
Defensive Rating
Economy
Basketball Statistics
Fantasy Basketball

References

External links 

Basketball statistics
Basketball terminology